The London Residuary Body was a body set up in 1985 to dispose of the assets of the Greater London Council after the council's abolition in 1986. Similar residuary bodies were set up for the metropolitan counties. After the abolition of the Inner London Education Authority, the LRB took control of its assets. The LRB was chaired throughout its existence by Sir Godfrey Taylor. In 1986 Tony Banks had two adjournment debates on the LRB, which he said "exists in a vain attempt to clear up the appalling mess left in London following the Government's ill-conceived, ill-considered and ill-finished abolition of the Greater London council", and called "an unelected, unaccountable body whose members were hand-picked by the Government".

Among the GLC assets disposed of by the LRB was County Hall and Parliament Hill Lido. After all of the assets were sold, the LRB was wound up in 1996.

The LRB left few traces: the most prominent being a sign with details for the car park close to the Royal Festival Hall and London Eye – which vanished in 2004 when the car park was built. Another is a sign on County Hall itself relating to the legal position of the walkway on the river front of County Hall signed by John Howes, Director of Administration of the LRB.

See also Workspace Group, who took on 18 properties from the LRB.

References

Primary
Acts of Parliament
 
Statutory Instruments

Secondary

References

1996 disestablishments in England
Greater London Council replacement organisations
1985 establishments in England